Gerry Sorensen (born October 15, 1958) is a Canadian former female alpine skier.

Sorensen was born in Kimberley, British Columbia, and began skiing at the age of 10.

World Cup victories

References

External links
 
 
 

1958 births
People from the Regional District of East Kootenay
Canadian female alpine skiers
Alpine skiers at the 1984 Winter Olympics
Olympic alpine skiers of Canada
Living people
Sportspeople from British Columbia
Canadian people of Danish descent